Sofia Carmina Coppola (born 14 May 1971) is an American filmmaker and actress. She has received numerous accolades, including an Academy Award, a Golden Globe Award, a Golden Lion, and a Cannes Film Festival Award, as well as a Primetime Emmy Award nomination. 

The youngest child and only daughter of filmmakers Eleanor and Francis Ford Coppola, she made her film debut as an infant in her father's acclaimed crime drama film The Godfather (1972). Coppola later appeared in several music videos, as well as a supporting role in Peggy Sue Got Married (1986). Coppola then portrayed Mary Corleone, the daughter of Michael Corleone, in The Godfather Part III (1990).

Coppola transitioned her career into filmmaking by making her feature-length directorial debut with the coming-of-age drama The Virgin Suicides (1999). It was the first of her collaborations with actress Kirsten Dunst. Coppola received the Academy Award for Best Original Screenplay for the comedy-drama Lost in Translation (2003), and became the third woman to be nominated for the Academy Award for Best Director. She has since directed the historical drama Marie Antoinette (2006), the family drama Somewhere (2010), the satirical crime drama The Bling Ring (2013), the southern gothic thriller The Beguiled (2017), and the comedy On the Rocks (2020). 

In 2015, Coppola released the Netflix Christmas musical comedy special A Very Murray Christmas, starring Bill Murray, which earned her a nomination for the Primetime Emmy Award for Outstanding Television Movie.

Early life
Coppola was born in New York City on May 14, 1971, the youngest child and only daughter of documentarian Eleanor (née Neil) and filmmaker Francis Ford Coppola. She is of Italian descent (Lucanian and Neapolitan) by her father's side and was raised on her parents' farm in Rutherford, California. Coppola graduated from St. Helena High School in 1989. She later attended Mills College and the California Institute of the Arts. At 15, Coppola interned with Chanel. After dropping out of college, Coppola started a clothing line called Milkfed, which is now sold exclusively in Japan. Among her extensive Hollywood family are her aunt Talia Shire, and her first cousins Nicolas Cage and Jason Schwartzman. Coppola had many varying interests growing up, including fashion, photography, music, and design, and did not initially intend to become a filmmaker. However, after making her first short film Lick the Star in 1998, she realized it "brought together all the things [she] loved," and decided to continue her directing pursuits.

Acting career
Coppola's acting career, marked by frequent criticisms of nepotism and negative reviews, began while she was an infant, as she made background appearances in seven of her father's films. The best known of these is her appearance in The Godfather as the infant Michael Francis Rizzi, in the baptism scene. Coppola also acted in her father's films The Outsiders (1983), in a scene where Matt Dillon, Tommy Howell, and Ralph Macchio are eating at a Dairy Queen; Rumble Fish (1983); The Cotton Club (1984); and Peggy Sue Got Married (1986), in which she portrayed Kathleen Turner's sister Nancy. Frankenweenie (1984) was the first film Coppola performed in that was not associated with her father; however, it often goes unnoted due to her stage name "Domino", which she adopted at the time because she thought it was glamorous. A short film entitled Life Without Zoe (1989), released as part of a tripartite anthology film New York Stories, was co-written by a teenage Coppola and her father; her father also directed the film.

During the nineties, she appeared in several music videos, including the ones for Sonic Youth's song Mildred Pierce from the Goo album, Sometimes Salvation by The Black Crowes, and The Chemical Brothers' Elektrobank, directed by her then partner Spike Jonze (who also appears in the video).

Coppola returned to her father's Godfather trilogy in both the second and third Godfather films, playing an immigrant child in The Godfather Part II and playing Michael Corleone's daughter in The Godfather Part III after the originally-cast actress, Winona Ryder, dropped out of the film at the last minute due to nervous exhaustion. It has been suggested that Coppola's performance in The Godfather Part III damaged Francis Ford Coppola's career and ruined Sofia's before it had even begun. Coppola has said that she never really wanted to act and only did it to help out when her father asked her to. It has also been suggested that Sofia's role in the film may have contributed to its box office performance, which started strongly and then went into decline. Coppola herself worried that she had only been given the role because she was the director's daughter, and the role placed a strain on her during the time of shooting that her mother observed in a series of diaries she wrote for Vogue during the filming. Coppola later stated that she was not hurt by the criticism from her work in the film because she never especially wanted an acting career.

After she was critically panned for her performance in The Godfather Part III (for which she was named "Worst Supporting Actress" and "Worst New Star" at the 1990 Golden Raspberry Awards), Coppola largely ended her acting career; however, she did appear in the independent film Inside Monkey Zetterland (1992), as well as in the backgrounds of films by her friends and family (for example, she appeared as Saché, one of Queen Padmé Amidala's five handmaidens, in George Lucas' 1999 film Star Wars: Episode I – The Phantom Menace). Coppola also appeared in several 1990s music videos: The Black Crowes' "Sometimes Salvation"; Sonic Youth's "Mildred Pierce"; Madonna's "Deeper and Deeper"; The Chemical Brothers' "Elektrobank", which was directed by her then-husband Spike Jonze; and later Phoenix's "Funky Squaredance".

In 2022, Coppola guest starred as herself with her husband Thomas Mars and fellow director Jim Jarmusch in a 2022 episode of the horror comedy series What We Do in the Shadows.

Filmmaking career

Coppola's first short film was Lick the Star (1998). It played many times on the Independent Film Channel. She made her feature film directing debut with The Virgin Suicides (1999); it received critical acclaim upon its premiere in North America at the 2000 Sundance Film Festival and was released later that year.

Coppola's second feature was Lost in Translation (2003). Coppola won the Academy Award for her original screenplay and three Golden Globe Awards including Best Picture Musical or Comedy. After Lina Wertmüller and Jane Campion, Coppola became the third female director to be nominated for an Academy Award for Directing and the second to win the Original Screenplay award, after Campion in 1994 (Wertmüller was also nominated). Her win for the best original screenplay in 2003 made her a third-generation Oscar winner. Coppola was the second woman, after Edith Head, to be nominated for three Oscars in one night. In 2004, Coppola was invited to join the Academy of Motion Picture Arts and Sciences.

Her third film was the biopic Marie Antoinette (2006), adapted from the biography by British historian Antonia Fraser. Kirsten Dunst plays the title character, who marries King Louis XVI, played by Jason Schwartzman, Coppola's cousin. It debuted at the 2006 Cannes Film Festival where, despite boos in the audience, it received a standing ovation. Though critics were divided at the time of its release, it has since received more critical acclaim in the years that followed.

Coppola's fourth film was Somewhere (2010), filmed at Chateau Marmont. The plot focuses on a "bad boy" actor Marco (portrayed by Stephen Dorff) who is forced to reevaluate his life when his daughter Cleo (played by Elle Fanning) arrives unexpectedly. The relationship between Marco and Cleo was loosely based on Coppola's own relationship with her father. The film won the prestigious Golden Lion at the Venice Film Festival. In November 2010, Coppola was interviewed by Joel Coen, who professed his admiration of her work, at the DGA screening of Somewhere in New York City.

Coppola's next film, The Bling Ring (2013), was based on actual events centered around the Bling Ring, a group of California teenagers who burgled the homes of several celebrities over 2008 and 2009, stealing around $3 million in cash and belongings. Emma Watson, Taissa Farmiga, Leslie Mann, Israel Broussard, Katie Chang, and Claire Julien starred in the film, which opened the Un Certain Regard section of the 2013 Cannes Film Festival.

An announcement in mid-December 2013 stated that American Zoetrope had successfully attained the screen rights for the memoir Fairyland: A Memoir of My Father and that Coppola would adapt the book with Andrew Durham. Coppola would also produce the film with her brother Roman.

In March 2014, it was reported that Coppola was in negotiations to direct a live-action adaptation of The Little Mermaid from a script by Caroline Thompson. Coppola wanted to shoot her version underwater, and although she later admitted that such a prospect was unrealistic, test footage was shot. In June 2015, it was announced Coppola had dropped out of the film due to creative differences.

Coppola collaborated again with her Lost in Translation star Bill Murray on A Very Murray Christmas, which starred Murray and was co-written by herself, Murray and Mitch Glazer. The film, an homage to classic Christmas-themed variety shows, was released in December 2015 on Netflix.

Coppola directed The Beguiled (2017), a remake of the 1971 eponymous Southern Gothic film, starring Nicole Kidman, Elle Fanning, and Kirsten Dunst. The film premiered at the 2017 Cannes Film Festival, where Coppola became the second woman (and the first American woman) to win the Best Director award.

Coppola again worked with Bill Murray on the film, On the Rocks, starring Murray and Rashida Jones.

The Virgin Suicides (1999) 

Coppola was first drawn to the story after reading the book by Jeffrey Eugenides in 1995, at the recommendation of musician Thurston Moore. Coppola said she felt the novel's author understood the teenage experience. She has also said that if not for the book, she may not have had a career in film. Specifically, Coppola has highlighted the representation of teenagers "lazing around," a situation she connected with but felt was not seen very much in films in any relatable way. The story's theme of loss was a personal connection for Coppola in light of the 1986 death of her oldest brother in a boating accident, though she stated that she did not immediately realize this connection. Coppola secured the rights to the novel without her father's help, and adapted the screenplay herself. The low-budget film drew praise from critics, and represented the point at which Coppola broke out of her father's shadow as a filmmaker in her own right. She credits the start of her career to the Cannes festival after the film premiered there.

Lost in Translation (2003) 

Coppola shot Lost in Translation in 27 days, with a small crew, working without permits. Scenes were filmed impromptu on the street, while scenes shot at the Park Hyatt Hotel allowed the crew to use its corridors between two and three in the morning without disturbing guests.

The film received positive reception and acclaim, as well as controversy due the film's usage "of Japan as an exotic and bizarre landscape for its American protagonists". The group Asian Mediawatch lobbied against the film's Academy Award nominations, stating "The film has no meaningful Japanese roles, nor is there any significant dialogue between the main characters and the Japanese. Such portrayals perpetuate negative stereotypes and attitudes that are harmful to Asian Americans in the US, where a significant minority of Americans already have negative attitudes towards Asians." Coppola responded to these allegations in an interview for The Independent, "I can see why people might think that, but I know I'm not racist. I think if everything's based on truth, you can make fun, have a little laugh, but also be respectful of a culture. I just love Tokyo, and I'm not mean-spirited...Even on our daily call sheets, they would mix up the 'rs' and the 'ls' – all that was from experience, it's not made up. I guess someone has misunderstood my intentions. It bugs me, because I know I'm not racist."

Marie Antoinette (2006) 

Marie Antoinette was shot on location at the Château de Versailles. Coppola herself has claimed that she was initially drawn towards the character of Marie Antoinette as an innocent and caring character who found herself in a situation outside of her control, and that rather than creating a historical representation, she wanted to create a more intimate look into the world of the heroine. The film's style is not that of a traditional biopic, and instead utilizes "hit songs and incongruous dialogue".

Somewhere (2010)

Somewhere depicts a newly famous actor (Stephen Dorff) recuperating from a minor injury whose wealth, fame, and professional experiences cannot allevaite the existential crisis he is experiencing, as he is forced to care for his 11-year-old daughter in the absence of his wife. The film premiered at the 67th Venice International Film Festival, and opened in the rest of Italy, on September 3, 2010. The festival jury unanimously awarded the film the Golden Lion prize for the best overall film. Quentin Tarantino, president of the jury, said the film "grew and grew in our hearts, in our minds, in our affections" after the first screening. The film would continue to receive critical acclaim, especially from notable film critic Roger Ebert of the Chicago Sun-Times who praised the detail in the portrait of Johnny Marco, writing, "Coppola is a fascinating director. She sees, and we see exactly what she sees. There is little attempt here to observe a plot. All the attention is on the handful of characters, on Johnny."

The Bling Ring (2013) 

The Bling Ring premiered at the 2013 Cannes Film Festival. It was inspired by a Vanity Fair feature on the real-life criminals depicted in the film, whom Coppola described as "products of our growing reality TV culture". The film received generally positive reviews, with many praising its style and performances, while some felt that the film glamorized the crimes in the story and failed to make an assertive message about them through the narrative; "Coppola neither makes a case for her characters nor places them inside of some kind of moral or critical framework; they simply pass through the frame, listing off name brands and staring at their phones,".

The Beguiled (2017) 

The film is based on the 1966 book of the same name by author Thomas P. Cullinan about a wounded Union soldier in a Mississippi seminary during the American Civil War, and was made for under $10 million. The film exhibited elements of the thriller genre, another departure for Coppola.

Coppola cited her intrigue with the South as part of the story's intrigue. Coppola has said that she "wanted the film to represent an exaggerated version of all the ways women were traditionally raised there just to be lovely and cater to men—the manners of that whole world, and how they change when the men go away". Coppola has cited Gone with the Wind as her inspiration for creating a film that was relatable despite its position within a different era.

The film faced a wave of controversy and division, including accusations of 'whitewashing' the original story after she chose to both remove the supporting role of a black female slave from the film, as well as to choose Kirsten Dunst to portray a character who was biracial in the original novel. Coppola also faced criticism for minimizing the story of the people experiencing actual hardship in favor of depicting, albeit authentically, the lavish lifestyle of her protagonists, thus minimizing the importance of a weighty topic. Coppola responded to these allegations by citing the presence of young girls among her moviegoing audience. The Beguiled is not the only of Coppola's films to be accused of exposing the sociocultural affordances of her own childhood.

Coppola described her version of the film as a reinterpretation, rather than a remake, of Don Siegel's 1971 adaption of the same book. Coppola wanted to tell the story of the male soldier entering into a classically southern and female environment from the point of view of the women and represent what that was like for them. Coppola thought that the earlier version made the characters out to be crazy caricatures and did not allow the viewer to know them.

While some critics claim that Coppola intended The Beguiled as a feminist work, Coppola explained that she is not in favor of that labeling. Though she has said she is happy if others see the film in this way, she sees it as a film, rather, that possesses a female perspective—an important distinction. The Beguiled was also made as a contrast to The Bling Ring, and Coppola has explained that 
she needed to correct that film's harsh Los Angeles aesthetic with something more beautiful and poetic.

On the Rocks (2020) 

Coppola's next film, On the Rocks, tells the story of a daughter and father, played by Rashida Jones and Bill Murray respectively, as they explore New York together in an attempt to mend their fractured relationship. It was released in a limited theatrical release on October 2, 2020, by A24 and was released for digital streaming on October 23, 2020, by Apple TV+. It received positive reviews from critics, who praised Coppola's screenplay and direction, and noted it as lighter than her previous films. Some critics stated that the film "isn't destined to achieve the same kind of iconic status as some of Coppola's previous work".

Style and influences 
Coppola arrived at a career in filmmaking with a background by means of acting, modeling, and design, all of which have influenced her directorial work. Her background in fashion, especially, has played a large part in the aesthetic tones of her films and has heightened the roles of design and style in her work. Her upbringing in a Hollywood family has also greatly influenced her work, as well as her public reception and image, and she has always had to fight accusations surrounding her background of privilege. After both winning an Oscar for Lost in Translation and showing The Beguiled, Coppola was accused by some critics of displaying the social and cultural privileges of her own childhood.

Coppola has described some of her influences as coming from her own work, with each film actively influencing the next. She points to Jeffrey Eugenides's book The Virgin Suicides, which was the inspiration for her first film of the same name, as the reason for her career in film.

Coppola has had to deal with sexism in the industry, and her quintessentially feminine work has been dismissed as decorative and insubstantial. Coppola has said that she is proud of the more "girly" aspects of her work and that she feels that she has a feminine point of view that she is happy to project. She has cited her upbringing around so many strong men as a possible reason for her strong connection to femininity. She has been open about her experiences with sexism in the industry and has cited them as a reason she favors working in the independent realm. Coppola has also said that big budget productions hinder her creative freedom, and so she prefers to work on films she can control. She has also criticized big studio production for its focus on business rather than art.

Coppola has cited her own perceptions of gaps in the film industry as her own inspiration, explaining that she has always made the films that she herself would have wanted to see as a younger person. She has described this younger demographic of girls as deprived of high-quality videography and as disrespected as an audience. She has also said that she likes making films for a young audience because she perceives them as smarter and more sophisticated than they are often given credit for.

Zoetrope, Francis Ford Coppola's production company, has backed all of her films. Her family ties have proven to hold both pros and cons, which she has articulated. Though she learned from her father and is proud of her family, she has said she is happy to have carved her own way. Coppola has also said that she is aware of her hard work and is grateful for her film education and that her connections in the film industry were helpful because of the lack of female directors. She said that she did what she could and is confident that her work is her own. After Francis Ford Coppola did not assist her in securing the rights to the Jeffrey Eugenides novel The Virgin Suicides, which her 1999 film was based on, much of the criticism surrounding her familial benefits subsided. Coppola usually involves her father in her projects. She has said that she likes being independent but respects him and his suggestions, though in the end always makes the choice she feels is right for a given movie. Coppola professed a love for being behind the camera and is not upset by the divisive reactions to some of her films. She has said that she "would rather do something that some people really connect to and some people reject" and that she never wants to make something that is just mediocre.

Reviews of Coppola's works often included "implied, gendered language" which undermine the body of the critics' arguments, as argued by Todd Kennedy in his article for Film Criticism titled "Off with Hollywood's Head: Sofia Coppola as Feminine Auteur". Kennedy cites multiple reviews of Coppola's work which rely upon allegations of her work as "sugarcoated" and flippant; "[the] implication is that Coppola 1) as a woman, only has the ability to make films because of her economic privilege, 2) only has whatever talent she does possess because of her all-powerful director/father, and 3) because her movies are feminine, can only produce pretty films that 'lack depth'".

Her style of films is described as "slow-moving portraits with bittersweet emotional palettes". Coppola likes to use visuals to convey what the characters are feeling at any given moment. Coppola's films often deal with melancholy stories with a dreamy aesthetic. Her films' aesthetics are influenced by her background in fashion with floral motifs and female beauty at the forefront of the films' set design and mise-en-scene. Coppola's films' focus on protagonists in life transitions and crises in their lives. Her characters feel stranded in their environments and alone even in the midst of other people. Visually portraying the experiences of these characters is one of Coppola's specialties.

Coppola's films often deal with themes of loneliness, wealth, privilege, isolation, youth, femininity, and adolescence in America. Her works utilize the "feminine gaze" and demonstrate a knowledge of feminist film theory, such as Laura Mulvey's "Visual Pleasure and Narrative Cinema".

Favorite films 
In a 2017 interview with IndieWire, Coppola named these films as her favorite.

Rumble Fish (1983)
Breathless (1960)
Lolita (1962)
Sixteen Candles (1984)
The Last Picture Show (1971)
Tootsie (1982)
The Heartbreak Kid (1972)
In the Mood for Love (2000)
Let the Right One In (2008)

Other work

Television
In the mid-1990s, Coppola and her best friend Zoe Cassavetes helmed the short-lived series Comedy Central series Hi Octane, which spotlit performers in underground music. The show was cancelled after four episodes.

In December 2008, Coppola's first commercial premiered during an episode of Gossip Girl. The advertisement she directed for the Christian Dior fragrance Miss Dior Chérie, shot in France with model Maryna Linchuk, was very well received and continues to be popular on YouTube.

In October 2014, Coppola launched a series of Christmas ads for the clothing chain Gap.

In May 2020, it was announced Coppola would write and direct an adaptation of The Custom of the Country by Edith Wharton for Apple TV+.

Modeling
At the beginning of the 1990s, Coppola was often featured in girl-oriented magazines like Seventeen and YM. In 1994, she co-founded the clothing line Milk Fed in Japan, with her friend Stephanie Hayman in cooperation with Sonic Youth's Kim Gordon. In 2001, the fashion designer Marc Jacobs chose the actress/director to be the "face" of his house's fragrance. The campaign involved photographs of Coppola shot by photographer Jürgen Teller. The July 2013 issue of Elle featured photographs shot by Coppola of Paris Hilton at Hilton's Beverly Hills mansion (Both model and house appear in The Bling Ring).

Stage direction

In 2017, before Coppola started pre-production on The Beguiled, she was asked by Italian state broadcaster Rai Com from All'Opera to direct their latest production of La Traviata. La traviata is a three act opera by Giuseppe Verdi set to an Italian libretto by Francesca Maria Piave. This Coppola-directed production was filmed for broadcast in Germany and France by Arte/ZDF, using multiple state-of-the art 4k cameras and up to 100 microphones. Coppola said in an interview she "could not turn down the project" with designer and fashion icon Valentino Garavani designing the costumes for this 15 show run of La Traviata (2017). Discussing her modern take on this classic story Coppola says "I wanted to bring out the personal side of the French courtesan, the party girl used to the social scene. It's a very feminine world that I love".

This was the first stage production Coppola directed. Coppola discusses how Valentino "really motivated me to take a chance and do something that was scary for me and very unfamiliar," and promised a "traditional" production that could nevertheless be appreciated by those who are not opera connoisseurs. Rome Opera House Director Carlo Fuortes said in an interview ticket sales had exceeded 1.2 million euros (1.35 million dollars), a record for the establishment.

All fifteen shows nearly sold out before opening night. It was the biggest box office success since the Teatro dell'Opera Di Roma opened in 1880.

Art 
Coppola sits on the board for Gagosian Gallery.

Personal life
In 1992, Coppola met director Spike Jonze; they married in 1999 and divorced in 2003. In an official statement, Coppola's publicist explained that the divorce decision was reached "with sadness". It is widely believed that the main character's husband in Lost in Translation is based on Jonze, as Coppola stated after the film's release, "There are elements of Spike there, elements of experiences."

From 2003 to 2005 Coppola dated filmmaker Quentin Tarantino. They have remained friends since their separation.

Coppola married musician Thomas Mars on August 27, 2011, at Palazzo Margherita in Bernalda, Italy. They met while producing the soundtrack to The Virgin Suicides. They have two daughters: Romy (born November 28, 2006), whose name is an homage to Coppola's brother Roman, and Cosima (born May 2010).

Coppola and her family lived in Paris for several years before moving to New York City in 2010.

Coppola has maintained a low public profile for her family, aiming for her daughters' lives to be unaffected by her career and travel. When asked if her choices as a parent to keep her children out of the spotlight is a result of her own upbringing, Coppola has explained that she never wants her children to be jaded.

Filmography

Director
Film

Television

Stage

Music videos
 "Shine" by Walt Mink (1993)
 "This Here Giraffe" by The Flaming Lips (1996)
 "Playground Love" by Air (2000)
 "City Girl" by Kevin Shields (2003)
 "I Just Don't Know What to Do with Myself" by The White Stripes (2003)
 "Chloroform" by Phoenix (2013)

Advertisements
 Miss Dior Chérie fragrance for Christian Dior starring Maryna Linchuk (2008)
 City of Light fragrance for Christian Dior starring Natalie Portman (2012)
 Marni collection for H&M starring Imogen Poots (2012)
 La vie en rose for Christian Dior fragrance Miss Dior starring Natalie Portman (2013)
 Daisy fragrance for Marc Jacobs starring Ondria Hardin, Malaika Firth, Antonia Wesseloh, and Sophia Ahrens (2013)
 Dress Normal for Gap (2014)
 Calvin Klein Underwear Women's Spring (2017)

Acting roles

Film

Television

Music videos
 "Mildred Pierce" by Sonic Youth (1990) – directed by Dave Markey
 "Deeper and Deeper" by Madonna (1992) – directed by Bobby Woods
 "Sometimes Salvation" by The Black Crowes (1992) – directed by Stéphane Sednaoui
 "Elektrobank" by The Chemical Brothers (1997) – directed by Spike Jonze
 "Funky Squaredance" by Phoenix (2002) – directed by Roman Coppola

Awards and nominations

Coppola's first awards were as an actress winning two Golden Raspberry Awards for her performance in her father's film, The Godfather Part III for Worst Supporting Actress and Worst New Star.

Coppola was nominated for three Academy Awards for her film Lost in Translation (2003), in the categories of Best Picture, Best Director, and Best Original Screenplay. She would go on to win for Best Original Screenplay but lost the other two nominations to Peter Jackson's The Lord of the Rings: The Return of the King. Coppola's nomination for Best Director made her the first American woman to be nominated in that category, and the third woman overall, after Lina Wertmüller and Jane Campion. In 2010, Kathryn Bigelow became the fourth woman to be nominated, and the first to win the award. Coppola, however, remains the youngest woman to be nominated in the Best Director category. Coppola's win for Best Original Screenplay (along with her cousin Nicolas Cage's 1996 win for Best Actor) resulted in her family's becoming the second three-generation Oscar-winning family, her grandfather Carmine Coppola and her father Francis Ford Coppola having previously won Oscars. The first family to achieve this feat was the Huston family, for wins by: Walter, John, and Anjelica. For her work on Lost in Translation, Coppola also won the Best Motion Picture and Best Screenplay Golden Globes, in addition to receiving three BAFTA Award nominations.

On September 11, 2010, Somewhere won the Golden Lion, the top prize at the Venice International Film Festival. Coppola is the first American woman to win the award.

On May 28, 2017, Coppola was awarded the Best Director Award at the Cannes Film Festival for The Beguiled, making her the second ever woman (and the first American woman) to win the award.

See also
 Coppola family tree
 List of Academy Award-winning families

Notes

References

Further reading
 
 
 
 
 "Off with Hollywood's Head: Sofia Coppola as Feminine Auteur". Film Criticism, 2010.

External links

 
 Milk fed. - Coppola's Japanese fashion label
 Sofia Mini - Coppola's Canned Wine
 
 

 

|-

1971 births
Living people
Sofia Carmina
Spiegel family
American child actresses
American expatriate actresses in France
American film actresses
American people of Italian descent
People of Campanian descent
People of Lucanian descent
American music video directors
Screenwriters from California
American women film directors
American women screenwriters
Best Screenplay Golden Globe winners
Best Original Screenplay Academy Award winners
Cannes Film Festival Award for Best Director winners
California Institute of the Arts alumni
César Award winners
Directors of Golden Lion winners
Ethical Culture Fieldston School alumni
Female music video directors
Film directors from Los Angeles
Golden Globe Award-winning producers
Independent Spirit Award for Best Director winners
Mills College alumni
People from Rutherford, California
Writers from Los Angeles
Writers Guild of America Award winners
Film directors from New York City
Screenwriters from New York (state)
People from Greenwich Village
Postmodernist filmmakers